XHOH-FM is a radio station in Durango, Durango. Broadcasting on 99.7 FM, XHOH is owned by Grupo Radiorama and carries its @FM (Arroba FM) pop format.

History
XHOH received its concession on August 25, 1993. It was originally owned by Radio Social, S.A., a subsidiary of Radiorama, and broadcast on 107.7 MHz.

XHOH moved to 99.7 on June 2, 2020. The move, like that of sister XHDRD-FM two years prior, was required as a condition of its concession renewal, to clear the 106–108 MHz sub-band for community and indigenous stations.

External links
Arroba FM website

References

Radio stations in Durango
Mass media in Durango City